"Week" is a song by South Korean singer Chungha. The song was initially the first single album of the singer, but was later repackaged into Chungha's first EP Hands on Me. It is also a pre-debut single.

Composition
The pre-release track "월화수목금토일 (Week)" is a ballad about the emptiness the singer felt after her former group's disbandment.

Music video
The music video was released on 20 April 2017 on YouTube.

Charts

Sales

Download

|}

References

2017 singles
2017 songs
Chungha songs
MNH Entertainment singles
Korean-language songs